The Superb was used as U.S. President Warren G. Harding's personal Pullman railroad car in a cross-country tour in 1923. After Harding's death, the car returned his body from San Francisco to Washington, D.C.  Built in 1911, it is the second-oldest steel private car in existence.  It had been used by Woodrow Wilson. In 1926 it was temporarily renamed Pope Pius XI for the Cardinal's Train from New York City to Chicago. Later it was an office car for the Charleston and West Carolina, Atlantic Coast Line and Seaboard Coast Line railroads.

The car was donated to the Southeastern Railway Museum in Duluth, Georgia in 1969 and opened to the public in 1995 after a 20-month restoration. It was placed on the National Register of Historic Places on March 9, 1998.

See also
Harding Railroad Car

References

External links
Southeastern Railway Museum

Railway vehicles on the National Register of Historic Places in Georgia (U.S. state)
Buildings and structures in Gwinnett County, Georgia
Warren G. Harding
Train-related introductions in 1911
National Register of Historic Places in Gwinnett County, Georgia
Private railroad cars
Transportation of the president of the United States